The 2022 Champion of Champions (officially the 2022 Cazoo Champion of Champions) was a professional snooker tournament that took place between 31 October and 6 November 2022 at the University of Bolton Stadium in Bolton, England. The 12th edition of the Champion of Champions since the tournament was first staged in 1978, it featured 16 participants, primarily winners of significant tournaments since the previous year's event. As an invitational tournament, it carried no world ranking points. The winner received £150,000 from a total prize fund of £440,000.

Judd Trump was the defending champion, having defeated John Higgins 10–4 in the 2021 final. Ronnie O'Sullivan defeated Trump 10–6 in the final to win his fourth Champion of Champions title. Trump made a maximum break in the eighth frame of the final, the seventh of his professional career and the second in the tournament's history.

Format

Prize fund 
 Winner: £150,000
 Runner-up: £60,000
 Semi-final: £30,000
 Group runner-up: £17,500
 First round loser: £12,500
 Total: £440,000

Qualification 
Players qualified for the event by winning events throughout the previous year. Events shown below in grey are for players who had already qualified for the event. Remaining participants were the highest ranked players in the world rankings.

{|class="wikitable" span = 50 style="font-size:85%;
|-
|style="background:lightgrey": #cfc;" width=10|
|Player also qualified by winning another tournament
|}

Tournament draw

Final

Century breaks
A total of 24  were made during the tournament.

 147, 114, 104, 100  Judd Trump
 141, 118  John Higgins
 140, 105  Mark Selby
 135, 131, 124, 117, 108, 106, 103  Ronnie O'Sullivan
 135, 130, 123  Fan Zhengyi
 132  Zhao Xintong
 122  Neil Robertson
 118, 110, 103  Mark Allen
 102  Robert Milkins

References

External links 
 

2022
2022 in snooker
2022 in English sport
Champion of Champions
Sport in Bolton